The Computational Biology Department (CBD) is a division within the School of Computer Science at Carnegie Mellon University in Pittsburgh, Pennsylvania, United States.  It is located in the Gates-Hillman Center. Established in 2007 by Robert F. Murphy as the Lane Center for Computational Biology with funding from Raymond J. Lane and Stephanie Lane, CBD became a department within the School of Computer Science in 2016.

CBD faculty and students conduct research in genomics, systems biology, and biological imaging.  Its faculty have served as president of the National Science Foundation, president of the International Society of Advanced Cytometry, and as a member of the National Institutes of Health Council of Councils; they have won awards such as the Overton Prize, a Guggenheim Fellowship, the Okawa Award, a United States Air Force Young Investigator Award, and a Presidential Young Investigator Award.

As part of the HHMI-NIBIB Interfaces Initiative, CBD received funding from Howard Hughes Medical Institute and the National Institute of Biomedical Imaging and Bioengineering (NIBIB) to develop an interdisciplinary Ph.D. program in computational biology with the University of Pittsburgh, which was founded as the Joint CMU-Pitt Ph.D. Program in Computational Biology in 2005. This program is currently receiving training support through a National Institutes of Health T32 Training Grant. CBD is the home of the B.S. in Computational Biology, one of the four B.S. degree programs within Carnegie Mellon School of Computer Science. The Computational Biology undergraduate program is ranked as one of the top 3 programs by US News. 

CBD is the home of an NIH Center for the HuBMAP Integration, Visualization & Engaging (HIVE) Initiative led by Ziv Bar-Joseph and an NIH Center for Multiscale Analysis of 4D Nucleome Structure and Function by Comprehensive Multimodal Data Integration led by Jian Ma.

Notable faculty 
 Robert F. Murphy (founding chair)
 Russell Schwartz (chair)
 Ziv Bar-Joseph
 Jaime Carbonell
 Jian Ma
 Kathryn Roeder
 Roni Rosenfeld
 Eric Xing

Notable meetings hosted 
 RECOMB 2014
 Great Lakes Bioinformatics Conference 2013 (joint with University of Pittsburgh)
 Automated Personal Genome Analysis (APGA) 2013
 Bioimage Informatics 2010

Degree programs 
 Joint CMU-Pitt Ph.D. Program in Computational Biology (with University of Pittsburgh)
 M.S. in Computational Biology (joint with the Department of Biological Sciences)
 M.S. in Biotechnology Innovation and Computation (joint with Language Technologies Institute)
 B.S. in Computational Biology
 Minor in Computational Biology

References 

Schools and departments of Carnegie Mellon
University departments in the United States
Bioinformatics organizations
Organizations established in 2007
2007 establishments in Pennsylvania